Conocrambus is a genus of moths of the family Crambidae.

Species
Conocrambus atrimictellus Hampson, 1919
Conocrambus dileucellus (Hampson, 1896)
Conocrambus medioradiellus (Hampson, 1919)
Conocrambus wollastoni (Rothschild, 1916)
Conocrambus xuthochroa (Turner, 1947)

References

Crambinae
Crambidae genera
Taxa named by George Hampson